Ashley Wright may refer to:

Ashley Wright (cricketer) (born 1980), English cricketer
Ashley Wright (snooker player) (born 1987), English snooker player
Ashley B. Wright (1841–1897), American politician